The Chinese Football Association (CFA) is the governing body for association football, beach soccer and futsal in People's Republic of China (Mainland China). The CFA organizes the men's and women's national teams and administers the country's professional leagues as well as organizing the national knockout cup competition Chinese FA Cup. As members of East Asian Football Federation its national teams are eligible for the East Asian Football Championship and the country's membership in AFC allows teams to participate in that organizations club and national team competitions. China is also a member of FIFA and is therefore eligible to play in the World Cup.

History
Founded in 1924, the Chinese Football Association became members of FIFA in 1931 and competed internationally at the 1936 and 1948 Olympic games.  Following the end of Chinese Civil War in 1949, both the People's Republic of China (PRC) and the Republic of China (ROC) contended to be the sole legitimate government of "China", and claimed sovereignty over both mainland China and Taiwan.  On 14 June 1952, FIFA acknowledged that the CFA on Mainland China, not the Republic of China Football Association (ROCFA) located on Taiwan, was the recognized authority over Chinese Football with their membership dating to 1931. Taiwan was admitted as a member of FIFA in June 1954 over the objections of the CFA and the PRC government at the 29th FIFA Congress in Bern.

The Chinese Football Association's objection to Taiwan's membership in FIFA continued with the organization offering proposals for the island's expulsion at the next two FIFA Congresses in 1956 and 1958. Then on 8 July 1958 the CFA notified FIFA of its withdraw as a member of the federation.  FIFA stipulations at the time required that once a withdraw be announced it must be confirmed three months later by registered mail.  With no such confirmation received, FIFA's Executive Committee still considered ACAF a member but all inquiries to the CFA or PRC were returned stating China no longer recognized FIFA's authority.  At a meeting of FIFA's Executive Committee in late October 1959, Victor Granatkin, the USSR Vice President of FIFA, reported that from his discussions with Chinese authorities, the CFA would only rescind its withdraw after the expulsion of Taiwan from the organization. The situation was resolved at FIFA's 42nd Congress when the Executive Committee's compromise proposal to allow Taiwan to remain a member of FIFA under the name Chinese Taipei Football Association and to readmit the Chinese Football Association was passed on 7 July 1980.

In 1992 the CFA under the auspices of the General Administration of Sport of China released plan to improve the quality of football in the nation. The plan included hiring Klaus Schlappner to coach the national team and as a technical adviser for the football federation and had the stated goals of attempting to enter the 1994 World Cup, to be among the top five teams in the 1995 Women's World Cup, qualify for the 1996 Olympic Games, represent Asia in the 1998 World Cup, to reach the quarter-finals of the 2000 Olympic Games, and to be among the top four teams in the 2002 World Cup.  Then in 1998, the then-Minister of Sports announced a ten-year plan for Chinese football with goals to reach the World Cup finals and become one of the top sixteen teams in the world by 2002.

National teams

Men's national team

The China national football team ( represents the People's Republic of China in international association football.  Since rejoining the international football community, the team achieved their highest FIFA ranking of 37 in December 1998.

The men's national team has won the EAFF East Asian Cup in 2005 and 2010, was runner-up at the AFC Asian Cup in 1984 and 2004, and made its sole FIFA World Cup appearance in 2002, losing all matches without scoring a goal.

Women's national team

The China women's national football team, represents the People's Republic of China in international association football. The team is colloquially referred to as "Zhōngguó Nǚzú" (and has been nicknamed the "Steel Roses".  The team achieved their highest FIFA ranking of 4 in 2003.

The women's team has won AFC Women's Asian Cup a record 8 times in 1986, 1989, 1991, 1993, 1995, 1997, 1999, and 2006 and were runners-up a two times in 2003, 2008.  They were also runners up at the 1999 FIFA Women's World Cup.

Professional leagues
Professional football in China is organized by the CFA and currently consists of four professional leagues organized in a hierarchical format with promotion and relegation between the leagues.  The Chinese Football Association Super League is the top flight of professional football in China after a rebranding of the National Football Jia A League in 2004.  Also founded in 2004, the Chinese Football Association China League is the second tier of professional football.  The Chinese Football Association Division Two League, founded in 1956 as the second level, the league was demoted to the third level in 1989.  The Chinese Football Association Member Association Champions League makes up the fourth level of football with relegated teams playing to league run by the regional CFA member football association.

League system

Member associations
As of 2015, there are total 44 member associations directly affiliated to CFA. The members are:

 Anhui Football Association 
 Beijing Football Association 
 Changchun Football Association 
 Chengdu Football Association 
 Chongqing Football Association 
 Dalian Football Association 
 Fujian Football Association 
 Gansu Football Association 
 Guangdong Football Association 
 Guangxi Football Association 
 Guangzhou Football Association 
 Guizhou Football Association 
 Hainan Football Association 
 Hebei Football Association 
 Heilongjiang Football Association 
 Henan Football Association 
 Hubei Football Association 
 Hunan Football Association 
 Inner Mongolia Football Association 
 Jiangsu Football Association 
 Jiangxi Football Association 
 Jilin Football Association 

 Kunming Football Association 
 Liaoning Football Association 
 Nanjing Football Association 
 Ningxia Football Association 
 Qingdao Football Association 
 Qinghai Football Association 
 Shaanxi Football Association 
 Shandong Football Association 
 Shanghai Football Association 
 Shanxi Football Association 
 Shenyang Football Association 
 Shenzhen Football Association 
 Sichuan Football Association 
 Tianjin Football Association 
 Tibet Football Association 
 Wuhan Football Association 
 Xiamen Football Association 
 Xi'an Football Association 
 Xinjiang Football Association 
 Yanbian Football Association 
 Yunnan Football Association 
 Zhejiang Football Association

Leadership

Current

List of Past Presidents and Vice Presidents

 President
 Huang Zhong (黄中) (1955–1979)
 Li Fenglou (1979–1985)
 Yuan Weimin (1985–1989)
 Nian Weisi (1989–1992)
 Yuan Weimin (1992–2014)
 Cai Zhenhua (2014–2019)
 Chen Xuyuan (2019–present)

 First Vice-President
 Sun Baorong (孙宝荣) (1989–1992)
 Wang Junsheng (王俊生) (1992–2000)
 Yan Shiduo (阎世铎) (2000–2004)
 Xie Yalong (谢亚龙) (2005–2008)
 Nan Yong (南勇) (2009)
 Wei Di (韦迪) (2010–2013)
 Zhang Jian (张剑) (2013–2019)
 Du Zhaocai (杜兆才) (2019–present)

References

External links
 
FIFA profile: China PR
China PR at AFC site
China PR at EAFF site

Chinese Football Association
Members of the All-China Sports Federation
China
Football
Sports organizations established in 1924
1924 establishments in China